Quark Author is Web-based software for creating XML. The focus of the software is to enable non-technical users, such as business users and other subject matter experts, to create structured content without having to know or understand XML. The purpose of the creation of the XML is to allow for automated omni-channel publishing using Quark Publishing Platform. Quark Author is built with HTML5 to provide an app-like experience and consequentially requires the use of modern Web browsers with HTML5 support (Windows Explorer 9 and higher, latest versions of Chrome and FireFox and Safari on the Mac).

Quark Author was developed by Quark, Inc.

Use and features

Initial release
 Smart Content Creation – XML behind the scenes using the Smart Content Schema
 Guided Authoring Experience – Users are presented with sections (that can be preconfigured) which are automatically populated with pre-formatted tags for the user to overtype 
 On-Demand Content Validation – Rather than validating as the user inputs content, this can happen at the user's discretion or when the content is 'checked in'
 Content Component and Media Reuse – Once content components have been created they can be used and tracked across multiple documents. The same applies to media like video and audio
 Fine-grained Metadata Support - Enables the author to input information about the content (at paragraph, word or character-level) to assist with searchability and how the content is published for example for personalization
 Automated Multi-channel Publishing - Integrated with Quark Publishing Platform for multi-channel output to various media types including mobile apps, PDF, Web, eBooks and print
 Versioning, Workflow and Component Content Management - Provided through its integration with Quark Publishing Platform
 Real-time Omni-channel Previews - Authors can request real-time previews of how their content will look in various output formats (is configured per customer)
 Collaboration - Authors can work on different sections of a document at the same time (permissions allowing)
 Reviewing Tools - Multi-user track changes and commenting
 Add Text, Images, Tables, Multi-Media and More - Authors can integrate Excel charts and tables, video, images etc. These are all referenced from the server to enable content reuse and updating
 Semantic and Emphasis Tagging - Lets subject matter experts style text in certain ways to apply meaning to that text that can be used downstream in the publishing process
 Standard Word Processing Tools – spell-checking, special character insertion, find/change, redo/undo
 Component Usage Tracking – Keeps track of which content components have been used where in which documents and lets the author see this within the software
 Component Pinning - Not all content should be dynamically updated; for example, if the user needs to use market data for a specific date. Component pinning is the act of locking a specific version of the content to a document
 Extensible - Uses Web technologies such as HTML, CSS, XML and Web Services for extensibility and integration

Release History
First version was released in 2014

References

External links 
 Quark Author Product Page (official site)
 Smart Content Overview (official site)

XML software
2014 software
Technical communication tools
Text editors
XML
XML editors